The Luha is a river in Ukraine and a right tributary of the Bug. Its source is located near village Kolpytiv located at the Horokhiv Upland and in its upper reaches the Luha runs mainly in western, northwestern direction, later in northward. In its lower stream it runs mainly in northwestern direction and enters Western Bug on northwestern outskirts of the city of Ustyluh.

Biggest tributaries: Luha-Svynoryika, Svynoryika, Rylovytsia (right side); Strypa (left side)

Character of the river is plain as it flows through swampy floodplains.

Major settlements along the river: Volodymyr, Ustyluh

In 2000 along the river was created local hydrological reserve "Luha".

References

External links
 Luha at the OpenStreetMap

Rivers of Volyn Oblast